Kévin Nicaise Tatila (born 17 April 1985) is a former Chadian footballer who played as a centre back and manager.

International career

Kevin debuted for Chad on 29 February 2012 in a match against Malawi.

Coaching career
Nicaise joined Léopold FC in the summer 2018. Ahead of the 2019–20 season, Kevin was appointed player-manager of the club after the departure of Thierry Blindenbergh. In October 2019, Vincent Kohl was hired to help Kevin out with the team. On 1 December 2019, Nicaise was replaced by Olivier Suray and continued as a player. Suray was fired on 9 February 2020 and Nicaise was again appointed manager, but this time, he preferred to stay on the bench to focus on coaching. Nicaise left Léopold at the end of the season, as the club was relegated.

In July 2020, he started a job as a physical coach at K.S.K. Heist and in August 2020, he was also hired as a scout at R.S.C. Anderlecht. In October 2020 it was confirmed, that Nicaise also had been appointed assistant coach to Emmanuel Trégoat for the Chad national football team.

Personal life
Kevin is the cousin of Faris Haroun who represents the Belgium national football team, and Nadjim Haroun who represents the Chad national football team.

References

External links
Kévin Nicaise at ZeroZero

1985 births
Living people
Footballers from Brussels
Chadian footballers
Chad international footballers
Belgian footballers
Belgian people of Chadian descent
Black Belgian sportspeople
Chadian expatriate footballers
Association football defenders
Royale Union Saint-Gilloise players
UR La Louvière Centre players
R.W.D.M. Brussels F.C. players
F.C.V. Dender E.H. players
Léopold FC players
Challenger Pro League players